Philippus Brietius (in French, Philippe Briet) (1601–1668) was a seventeenth-century French Jesuit historian and cartographer.

List of works
Acute dicta omnium veterum Latinorum poetarum opus editum ad usum serenissimi Ducis Guisii . . . de omnibus iisdem poeticis syntagma. Paris, F. Muguet, 1664
Theatre Geographique de l'Europe... Paris, Pierre Mariette.
Parallela Geogr. Veterus et Novae 1648, Atlas 1653.

External links
 La partie Occidentale de la Grande Aquitaine
Imperium Romanum. Auth. Phil. Briet e Societ Iesu (1650)

17th-century French Jesuits
French cartographers
1601 births
1668 deaths
17th-century cartographers
17th-century French historians
French male non-fiction writers
People from Abbeville
17th-century French male writers